105 is the emergency telephone number in Mongolia. It is also a single non-emergency number in the United Kingdom and New Zealand. In the United Kingdom, it connects to the caller's local distribution network operator, and is primarily marketed for reporting power cuts. In New Zealand, it is used to contact the police in general non-emergency situations.

In the United Kingdom 
Prior to the launch of the single number in 2016, people wishing to contact the relevant electric distribution company would have needed to know the 11-digit phone number of the electricity distribution company who served their area. Industry research following winter storms in 2013/2014 showed that most people in the event of a power cut would contact their electricity supplier (who sources or generates the electricity and bills the consumer) rather than the network operator (who is responsible for delivering power from the National Grid).

In New Zealand 
Launched on 10 May 2019, 105 is used for non-emergency calls to Police where the event has already taken place and nobody is in any danger, such as a stolen car or property damage. It is the analogue of the 101 telephone number in the UK.

See also 

 Electricity sector in the United Kingdom
 101 (telephone number)
 111 (emergency telephone number)
 999 (emergency telephone number)

References

External links 
 United Kingdom website
 New Zealand website

Electric power infrastructure in the United Kingdom
Telecommunications-related introductions in 2016
Telecommunications-related introductions in 2019
Telephone numbers in New Zealand
Telephone numbers in the United Kingdom
Three-digit telephone numbers